Sir Michael John Llewellyn-Smith  (born 25 April 1939) is a retired British diplomat and academic. He served as Ambassador to Poland from 1991 to 1996 and Ambassador to Greece from 1996 to 1999. He is visiting professor at the Centre for Hellenic Studies, King's College London.

Early life
Llewellyn-Smith was born in 1939. He was educated at Wellington College, a private school in Crowthorne, Berkshire. He attended New College, Oxford, where he studied classics, ancient history and philosophy.

Diplomatic career
Llewellyn-Smith joined Her Majesty's Diplomatic Service in 1970. On 29 March 1980, he was appointed Consul-General at Athens.

Later life
Following retirement, Llewellyn-Smith has spent his time writing and lecturing about Greek history and culture. He is visiting professor at the Centre for Hellenic Studies, King's College London. He is a regular speaker on Swan Hellenic cruises.

Honours
On 25 March 1996, Llewellyn-Smith was appointed Knight Commander of the Royal Victorian Order (KCVO). He is an Honorary Fellow of St Antony's College, University of Oxford.

Writings
In 1965, he published The Great Island: A Study of Crete. In 1973, he published the book Ionian Vision: Greece in Asia Minor, 1919–1922 on the Asia Minor Campaign. In 2004, he published Athens: A Cultural and Literary History.

References

1939 births
Living people
Ambassadors of the United Kingdom to Poland
Ambassadors of the United Kingdom to Greece
Knights Commander of the Royal Victorian Order
People educated at Wellington College, Berkshire
Alumni of New College, Oxford
British philhellenes
British historians
Historians of modern Greece